The Bermuda Cricket Board (BCB) is the official ICC recognised organisation chosen to represent Bermuda in terms of cricket issues. The board was set up in 1938, and became an associate member of the International Cricket Council in 1966. The Bermuda national cricket team qualified for the 2007 Cricket World Cup, the peak of Bermudian cricket.

The Headquarters of BCB are at Point Finger Road, Paget, DV 04, Bermuda.

History
The first recorded cricket match played in Bermuda was on August 30, 1844. Later, in 1845, the Bermuda Cricket Club. In 1948 the Somers Isles Cricket League merged with Bermuda Cricket Club to form Bermuda Cricket Board, which became the current BCB in 2003.

La BCB was stablished in 1938 and has been an associate member of the International Cricket Council (ICC) since 1966.

Grounds

Please refer to this link for getting more information on Cricket Grounds in Bermuda.

Domestic competitions

T20 league 
2013: St. Davies CCC
 2014: Southampton Rangers Sports Club
 2015: Southampton Rangers Sports Club
 2016: Somerset Cricket Club
 2017: St. David's CCC
 2018: St. David's CCC
 2019: Southampton Rangers Sports Club
 2020: Southampton Rangers Sports Club
 2021: St. George's Cricket Club

References

External links
Official website
Cricinfo-Bermuda

Cricket administration
Cricket in Bermuda
Cricket
Sports organizations established in 1938
1938 establishments in Bermuda